Acanthodactylus hardyi, known commonly as  Hardy's fringe-fingered lizard or the Nidua fringe-fingered lizard, is a species of lizard in the family Lacertidae. The species is endemic to Western Asia.

Etymology
The specific name, hardyi, is in honor of British entomologist J.E. Hardy who collected the holotype.

Geographic range
A. hardyi is found in Iraq, Jordan, Kuwait, and Saudi Arabia.

Reproduction
A. hardyi is oviparous.

References

Further reading
Haas G (1957). "Some Amphibians and Reptiles from Arabia". Proceedings of the California Academy of Sciences, Fourth Series 29 (3): 47–86. (Acanthodactylus scutellatus hardyi, new subspecies, p. 72).
Harris, David J.; Arnold, E. Nicholas (2000). "Elucidation of the relationships of spiny-footed lizards, Acanthodactylus ssp. (Reptilia: Lacertidae) using mitochondrial DNA sequence, with comments on their biogeography and evolution". Journal of Zoology 252 (3): 351–362. (Acanthodactylus hardyi, new status).
Rifai, Lina; Modrý, David; Necas, Petr; Amr, Zuhair S. (2013). "The occurrence of Acanthodactylus hardyi Haas, 1957 in the Hashemite Kingdom of Jordan with notes on its ecology". Zoology in the Middle East 288 (1): 33. (in English, with an abstract in German).

Acanthodactylus
Reptiles described in 1957
Taxa named by Georg Haas